Swansea District before 1885 also known as Swansea District of Boroughs was a borough constituency. It was represented in the House of Commons of the Parliament of the United Kingdom. It elected one Member of Parliament (MP) by the first past the post system of election.

Overview
The seat was created for the 1832 general election, and abolished for the 1918 general election. Swansea District was a strongly Liberal constituency, dominated by the tinplate and steel industries, together with coal.

Boundaries 
Upon its creation in 1832 it comprised five small boroughs: Swansea, Neath, Aberavon, Kenfig and Loughor. A small increase in their limits occurred in 1868.

In 1885, the seat was split into two, with the central part of Swansea borough forming the Swansea Town constituency, and the northern part of Swansea borough centred on Morriston, together with the four smaller boroughs, forming the seat Swansea District.

The first member after 1885 was Henry Vivian, who had represented Glamorgan county 1857–1885.

Members of Parliament 
Constituency created (1832)

Electoral history

Elections in the 1830s

Elections in the 1840s

Elections in the 1850s

Vivian's death caused a by-election.

Elections in the 1860s

Elections in the 1870s

Elections in the 1880s

In 1886, Vivian briefly joined the Liberal Unionists but was nevertheless returned unopposed and returned to the Gladstonian fold soon after the election.

Elections in the 1890s

In 1893, when he was elevated to the peerage becoming Lord Swansea, he was succeeded by the Morriston tinplate owner, William Williams. 

Williams served for only two years before being replaced in 1895 by Brynmor Jones. Jones had strong nonconformist connections but his political career was undistinguished and he concentrated on his legal career.

Elections in the 1900s

Elections in the 1910s

References

Further reading
 
 
 

Politics of Swansea
Historic parliamentary constituencies in South Wales
Constituencies of the Parliament of the United Kingdom established in 1832
Constituencies of the Parliament of the United Kingdom disestablished in 1918